Nikolay Grigoryevich Belov (23 November 1919 – 14 October 1987) was a Soviet wrestler who competed in the 1952 Summer Olympics. Belov won the bronze medal at the 1952 Summer Olympics in wrestling. He won the gold medal at the 1947 European Championship.

External links
Nikolay Belov's profile at Sports Reference.com
Biography of Nikolay Belov 

1919 births
1987 deaths
Russian male sport wrestlers
Soviet male sport wrestlers
Wrestlers at the 1952 Summer Olympics
Olympic wrestlers of the Soviet Union
Medalists at the 1952 Summer Olympics
Olympic medalists in wrestling
Olympic bronze medalists for the Soviet Union